"No Surrender (to the IRA)" is a chant sung to the tune of the hymn "Oil in My Lamp", expressing opposition to the Provisional Irish Republican Army, that has been used as a football chant by England fans. It was sung in pubs in the 1970s and 1980s. It was sung by Rangers F.C. supporters, many of whom have strong unionist beliefs. It may have been adopted by English fans who switched to following Scottish clubs during the five-year period that English clubs were banned from competing in European cups following the Heysel Stadium disaster. In the 21st century the song is controversial and many supporters refuse to sing it. The English Football Association emailed supporters asking them to refrain from singing it ahead of a May 2013 game against the Republic of Ireland, but it continues to be sung.

History 
The "No Surrender" slogan derives from the 1689 Siege of Derry. The song is associated with unionism and particularly Northern Irish unionism.  It expresses opposition to the various iterations of the Irish Republican Army, which carried out hundreds of bombings and killings targeting British security personnel and civilians, especially during the Troubles (1960s–1998). The origins of the song are unknown but it was chanted in pubs in the 1970s and 1980s and has been associated with the National Front and the British National Party.  

The song came to be sung by fans of Rangers F.C. some of whom have strong unionist beliefs, in contrast with the Catholic republicans of many supporters of Celtic F.C., their Old Firm rivals. The song may have been popularised among English supporters after the Heysel Stadium disaster in Brussels in 1985, which resulted in a five-year ban on English clubs competing in European competition. Some English fans chose to follow Scottish clubs instead and Rangers, one of the more successful, attracted a sizeable English following.

The chant is not taken up by all supporters but has become associated with England fans in the late 20th and the 21st century, being particularly noticeable at away matches. A 2013 BBC report said that the chanting seemed to originate within sections occupied by members of the official supporter's club. The chant's popularity has lasted long after the 1998 Good Friday Agreement resolved most of the violence associated with the Troubles. The chant has also been used by the far-right English Defence League and, since the war on terror, has been modified in some cases to refer to al-Qaeda and the Taliban instead of the IRA. Other variants have referred to the eurozone crisis with "IRA" being replaced with "IMF" (International Monetary Fund), "EU" (European Union) or "ECB" (European Central Bank).

While some fans consider the song controversial, sectarian and associated with the far right and refuse to sing the chant, others consider it only as an anti-terrorist statement and continue to participate. It is not a criminal offence to sing "No Surrender" but in some circumstances it could be considered by some people to contravene article three of FIFA's statutes: "Discrimination of any kind against a country, private person or group of people on account of ethnic origin, gender, language, religion, politics or any other reason is strictly prohibited and punishable by suspension or expulsion".

In addition to the song some fans insert a shout of "no surrender" into the musical bridge before the line "send her victorious" in the British national anthem. The Football Association (FA) has, on a number of occasions, attempted to drown this out by increasing the volume of the music.

Recent history 
In May 2013 England faced the Republic of Ireland for the first time since the February 1995 friendly which had descended into the Lansdowne Road football riot after just 27 minutes. Hoping to avoid any provocations the FA sent an email to attendees, signed by England manager Roy Hodgson asking them to refrain from singing "No Surrender". England fans accused the FA of increasing the risk of unrest by drawing attention to the song. A supporters' club spokesman said: "The FA have never made an issue of it in the past but they have made no attempt to explain why it's so offensive. I've never understood why some fans chant that because you don't go to England games to talk about political debate – and a lot of the people who chant it weren't even born when the IRA carried out their bombings on mainland Britain." The song was sung during that match.

The issue was brought to the fore again ahead of the November 2014 match against Scotland at Celtic Park, Glasgow. Given the host ground the FA was mindful of causing unrest and again requested that the song not be sung. This time it was not, but the fans instead chanted "fuck the IRA" in time with the drums of the supporters' band for ten minutes at a time. At half time in the match an FA representative requested that the drummers stop playing. In recent years the song has continued to be sung by England supporters including at the June 2019 UEFA Nations League Finals in Portugal and during unrest in Prague 2019 associated with a UEFA Euro 2020 qualifying match.

Lyrics 
The song is sung to the tune of the hymn "Oil in My Lamp" (also known as "Give Me Joy in My Heart").

Verse:
With St George in my heart,
Keep me English,
With St George in my heart I pray,
With St George in my heart,
Keep me English,
Keep me English
Till my dying day.

Chorus:
No surrender,
No surrender,
No surrender to the IRA. Scum.

References 

Anti-Irish sentiment
Football songs and chants
History of the England national football team
Irish Republican Army
The Troubles (Northern Ireland)